Hot Summer Night is an alternative title for 1977 Meatloaf song "You Took the Words Right Out of My Mouth"

Hot Summer Night or variants may also refer to:

Film and Theatre
 Hot Summer Night (play), 1958 play by Ted Willis, televised in Britain on 1 February 1959
 Hot Summer Night (film), 1957 MGM crime film 
 One Hot Summer Night, 1998 television movie directed by James A. Contner
 Hot Summer Nights (film), a 2017 American drama film directed by Elijah Bynum, starring Timothée Chalamet, Alex Roe, and Maika Monroe

Music
 "Hot Summer Night", song by Vicki Sue Robinson (1981)
 "Hot Summer Night (Oh La La La)", song by David Tavaré (2007)
 "Long Hot Summer Night", song by Jimi Hendrix from Electric Ladyland (1968)
 "Long Hot Summer Night", song by J.T. Taylor from Feel the Need (1991)
 "Two Hot Girls (On a Hot Summer Night)", song by Carly Simon from the album Songs from the Trees (1987)
 A Hot Summer Night...with Donna, Donna Summer video (1983)
 "Hot Summer Nights", track by Miami Sound Machine on the Top Gun soundtrack (1986)
 "Hot Summer Nights", song by Night (1979)

Other uses
Hot Summer Night (wrestling match), 1985 event in Hawaii